Naturally occurring cerium (58Ce) is composed of 4 stable isotopes: 136Ce, 138Ce, 140Ce, and 142Ce, with 140Ce being the most abundant (88.48% natural abundance) and the only one theoretically stable; 136Ce, 138Ce, and 142Ce are predicted to undergo double beta decay but this process has never been observed. There are 35 radioisotopes that have been characterized, with the most stable being 144Ce, with a half-life of 284.893 days; 139Ce, with a half-life of 137.640 days and 141Ce, with a half-life of 32.501 days. All of the remaining radioactive isotopes have half-lives that are less than 4 days and the majority of these have half-lives that are less than 10 minutes. This element also has 10 meta states.

The isotopes of cerium range in atomic weight from 119 u (119Ce) to 157 u (157Ce).

List of isotopes 

|-
| 119Ce
| style="text-align:right" | 58
| style="text-align:right" | 61
| 118.95276(64)#
| 200# ms
| β+
| 119La
| 5/2+#
|
|
|-
| 120Ce
| style="text-align:right" | 58
| style="text-align:right" | 62
| 119.94664(75)#
| 250# ms
| β+
| 120La
| 0+
|
|
|-
| 121Ce
| style="text-align:right" | 58
| style="text-align:right" | 63
| 120.94342(54)#
| 1.1(1) s
| β+
| 121La
| (5/2)(+#)
|
|
|-
| rowspan=2|122Ce
| rowspan=2 style="text-align:right" | 58
| rowspan=2 style="text-align:right" | 64
| rowspan=2|121.93791(43)#
| rowspan=2|2# s
| β+
| 122La
| rowspan=2|0+
| rowspan=2|
| rowspan=2|
|-
| β+, p
| 121Ba
|-
| rowspan=2|123Ce
| rowspan=2 style="text-align:right" | 58
| rowspan=2 style="text-align:right" | 65
| rowspan=2|122.93540(32)#
| rowspan=2|3.8(2) s
| β+
| 123La
| rowspan=2|(5/2)(+#)
| rowspan=2|
| rowspan=2|
|-
| β+, p
| 122Ba
|-
| 124Ce
| style="text-align:right" | 58
| style="text-align:right" | 66
| 123.93041(32)#
| 9.1(12) s
| β+
| 124La
| 0+
|
|
|-
| rowspan=2|125Ce
| rowspan=2 style="text-align:right" | 58
| rowspan=2 style="text-align:right" | 67
| rowspan=2|124.92844(21)#
| rowspan=2|9.3(3) s
| β+
| 125La
| rowspan=2|(7/2−)
| rowspan=2|
| rowspan=2|
|-
| β+, p
| 124Ba
|-
| 126Ce
| style="text-align:right" | 58
| style="text-align:right" | 68
| 125.92397(3)
| 51.0(3) s
| β+
| 126La
| 0+
|
|
|-
| 127Ce
| style="text-align:right" | 58
| style="text-align:right" | 69
| 126.92273(6)
| 29(2) s
| β+
| 127La
| 5/2+#
|
|
|-
| 128Ce
| style="text-align:right" | 58
| style="text-align:right" | 70
| 127.91891(3)
| 3.93(2) min
| β+
| 128La
| 0+
|
|
|-
| 129Ce
| style="text-align:right" | 58
| style="text-align:right" | 71
| 128.91810(3)
| 3.5(3) min
| β+
| 129La
| (5/2+)
|
|
|-
| 130Ce
| style="text-align:right" | 58
| style="text-align:right" | 72
| 129.91474(3)
| 22.9(5) min
| β+
| 130La
| 0+
|
|
|-
| style="text-indent:1em" | 130mCe
| colspan="3" style="text-indent:2em" | 2453.6(3) keV
| 100(8) ns
|
|
| (7−)
|
|
|-
| 131Ce
| style="text-align:right" | 58
| style="text-align:right" | 73
| 130.91442(4)
| 10.2(3) min
| β+
| 131La
| (7/2+)
|
|
|-
| style="text-indent:1em" | 131mCe
| colspan="3" style="text-indent:2em" | 61.8(1) keV
| 5.0(10) min
| β+
| 131La
| (1/2+)
|
|
|-
| 132Ce
| style="text-align:right" | 58
| style="text-align:right" | 74
| 131.911460(22)
| 3.51(11) h
| β+
| 132La
| 0+
|
|
|-
| style="text-indent:1em" | 132mCe
| colspan="3" style="text-indent:2em" | 2340.8(5) keV
| 9.4(3) ms
| IT
| 132Ce
| (8−)
|
|
|-
| 133Ce
| style="text-align:right" | 58
| style="text-align:right" | 75
| 132.911515(18)
| 97(4) min
| β+
| 133La
| 1/2+
|
|
|-
| style="text-indent:1em" | 133mCe
| colspan="3" style="text-indent:2em" | 37.1(8) keV
| 4.9(4) d
| β+
| 133La
| 9/2−
|
|
|-
| 134Ce
| style="text-align:right" | 58
| style="text-align:right" | 76
| 133.908925(22)
| 3.16(4) d
| EC
| 134La
| 0+
|
|
|-
| 135Ce
| style="text-align:right" | 58
| style="text-align:right" | 77
| 134.909151(12)
| 17.7(3) h
| β+
| 135La
| 1/2(+)
|
|
|-
| style="text-indent:1em" | 135mCe
| colspan="3" style="text-indent:2em" | 445.8(2) keV
| 20(1) s
| IT
| 135Ce
| (11/2−)
|
|
|-
| 136Ce
| style="text-align:right" | 58
| style="text-align:right" | 78
| 135.907172(14)
| colspan=3 align=center|Observationally Stable
| 0+
| 0.00185(2)
| 0.00185–0.00186
|-
| style="text-indent:1em" | 136mCe
| colspan="3" style="text-indent:2em" | 3095.5(4) keV
| 2.2(2) µs
|
|
| 10+
|
|
|-
| 137Ce
| style="text-align:right" | 58
| style="text-align:right" | 79
| 136.907806(14)
| 9.0(3) h
| β+
| 137La
| 3/2+
| 
| 
|-
| rowspan=2 style="text-indent:1em" | 137mCe
| rowspan=2 colspan="3" style="text-indent:2em" | 254.29(5) keV
| rowspan=2|34.4(3) h
| IT (99.22%)
| 137Ce
| rowspan=2|11/2−
| rowspan=2|
| rowspan=2|
|-
| β+ (.779%)
| 137La
|-
| 138Ce
| style="text-align:right" | 58
| style="text-align:right" | 80
| 137.905991(11)
| colspan=3 align=center|Observationally Stable
| 0+
| 0.00251(2)
| 0.00251–0.00254
|-
| style="text-indent:1em" | 138mCe
| colspan="3" style="text-indent:2em" | 2129.17(12) keV
| 8.65(20) ms
| IT
| 138Ce
| 7-
|
|
|-
| 139Ce
| style="text-align:right" | 58
| style="text-align:right" | 81
| 138.906653(8)
| 137.641(20) d
| EC
| 139La
| 3/2+
|
|
|-
| style="text-indent:1em" | 139mCe
| colspan="3" style="text-indent:2em" | 754.24(8) keV
| 56.54(13) s
| IT
| 139Ce
| 11/2−
|
|
|-
| 140Ce
| style="text-align:right" | 58
| style="text-align:right" | 82
| 139.9054387(26)
| colspan=3 align=center|Stable
| 0+
| 0.88450(51)
| 0.88446–0.88449
|-
| style="text-indent:1em" | 140mCe
| colspan="3" style="text-indent:2em" | 2107.85(3) keV
| 7.3(15) µs
|
|
| 6+
|
|
|-
| 141Ce
| style="text-align:right" | 58
| style="text-align:right" | 83
| 140.9082763(26)
| 32.508(13) d
| β−
| 141Pr
| 7/2−
|
|
|-
| 142Ce
| style="text-align:right" | 58
| style="text-align:right" | 84
| 141.909244(3)
| colspan=3 align=center|Observationally Stable
| 0+
| 0.11114(51)
| 0.11114–0.11114
|-
| 143Ce
| style="text-align:right" | 58
| style="text-align:right" | 85
| 142.912386(3)
| 33.039(6) h
| β−
| 143Pr
| 3/2−
|
|
|-
| 144Ce
| style="text-align:right" | 58
| style="text-align:right" | 86
| 143.913647(4)
| 284.91(5) d
| β−
| 144mPr
| 0+
|
|
|-
| 145Ce
| style="text-align:right" | 58
| style="text-align:right" | 87
| 144.91723(4)
| 3.01(6) min
| β−
| 145Pr
| (3/2−)
|
|
|-
| 146Ce
| style="text-align:right" | 58
| style="text-align:right" | 88
| 145.91876(7)
| 13.52(13) min
| β−
| 146Pr
| 0+
|
|
|-
| 147Ce
| style="text-align:right" | 58
| style="text-align:right" | 89
| 146.92267(3)
| 56.4(10) s
| β−
| 147Pr
| (5/2−)
|
|
|-
| 148Ce
| style="text-align:right" | 58
| style="text-align:right" | 90
| 147.92443(3)
| 56(1) s
| β−
| 148Pr
| 0+
|
|
|-
| 149Ce
| style="text-align:right" | 58
| style="text-align:right" | 91
| 148.9284(1)
| 5.3(2) s
| β−
| 149Pr
| (3/2−)#
|
|
|-
| 150Ce
| style="text-align:right" | 58
| style="text-align:right" | 92
| 149.93041(5)
| 4.0(6) s
| β−
| 150Pr
| 0+
|
|
|-
| 151Ce
| style="text-align:right" | 58
| style="text-align:right" | 93
| 150.93398(11)
| 1.02(6) s
| β−
| 151Pr
| 3/2−#
|
|
|-
| 152Ce
| style="text-align:right" | 58
| style="text-align:right" | 94
| 151.93654(21)#
| 1.4(2) s
| β−
| 152Pr
| 0+
|
|
|-
| 153Ce
| style="text-align:right" | 58
| style="text-align:right" | 95
| 152.94058(43)#
| 500# ms [>300 ns]
| β−
| 153Pr
| 3/2−#
|
|
|-
| 154Ce
| style="text-align:right" | 58
| style="text-align:right" | 96
| 153.94342(54)#
| 300# ms [>300 ns]
| β−
| 154Pr
| 0+
|
|
|-
| 155Ce
| style="text-align:right" | 58
| style="text-align:right" | 97
| 154.94804(64)#
| 200# ms [>300 ns]
| β−
| 155Pr
| 5/2−#
|
|
|-
| 156Ce
| style="text-align:right" | 58
| style="text-align:right" | 98
| 155.95126(64)#
| 150# ms
| β−
| 156Pr
| 0+
|
|
|-
| 157Ce
| style="text-align:right" | 58
| style="text-align:right" | 99
| 156.95634(75)#
| 50# ms
| β−
| 157Pr
| 7/2+#
|
|

References 

 Isotope masses from:

 Isotopic compositions and standard atomic masses from:

 Half-life, spin, and isomer data selected from the following sources.

 
Cerium
Cerium